Euzebyella saccharophila is a Gram-negative, aerobic and heterotrophic bacterium from the genus of Euzebyella which has been isolated from seawater from Castellón in Spain.

References 

Flavobacteria
Bacteria described in 2010